The Hope is a Grade II listed public house at 94 Cowcross Street, Smithfield, London. It was built in the late 19th century. It is an example of an early house; a traditional pub that opens to drinkers first thing in the morning, although the pub now keeps more conventional opening hours.

See also
 List of pubs in London

References

Buildings and structures in Clerkenwell
Grade II listed pubs in London
Smithfield, London
Grade II listed buildings in the London Borough of Islington
Pubs in the London Borough of Islington